is a Japanese singer, actress and a former member of the idol group AKB48, belonging to Team A. She had a recurring role on Kamen Rider W as Elizabeth, alongside group member Tomomi Itano. Together, they make up the sub-unit Queen & Elizabeth.

On November 10, 2012, it was announced she would be making her solo debut. It was released on December 26. On December 17, Kasai announced that she would leave the group. Her farewell ceremony was on May 3, 2013.

Personal life 
She is the younger sister of former singer Rion Kasai.

On May 15, 2021, Kasai announced her marriage to acrobat gymnast and actor Keita Koyama. She gave birth to their first child, a daughter in 2022.

Discography

Solo singles 
  (2012) - Sales: 44,982
 "Mine" (2013) - Sales: 22,417
  (2014) - Sales: 13,697
  (2014) - Sales: 7,152

Albums 
 "STAR-T!" (2017) - Sales: 3,000

With AKB48

With SKE48

as Queen & Elizabeth
 "Love Wars" (Kamen Rider W soundtrack)

Theatre 
 Peter Pan (2018–2019) Wendy Darling
 Annie (2020–2021) Lily St. Regis

Stage units
 
 
 
 Team K 3rd Stage: Maria
 
 	
 
 	
 	
  (May 28, 2005, replacing Atsuko Maeda)

Filmography

Television
 ICE: Aoi
 Kamen Rider W: Elizabeth
 Digimon Xros Wars: Bastemon (Voice)
 Meshibana Keiji Tachibana (2013): Muranaka

Movies
 Kamen Rider × Kamen Rider W & Decade: Movie War 2010 (2009) as Elizabeth
 Kamen Rider W Forever: A to Z/The Gaia Memories of Fate (2010) as Elizabeth
 Neck (2010) as Mao
 Kamen Rider × Kamen Rider OOO & W Featuring Skull: Movie War Core (2010) as Elizabeth

References

External links

  
 Official agency profile 
 Official music profile 

1991 births
Living people
Singers from Tokyo
AKB48 members
Japanese women pop singers
Japanese idols
Japanese voice actresses
21st-century Japanese women singers
21st-century Japanese singers
21st-century Japanese actresses